Acrolophus spathista is a moth of the family Acrolophidae. It is found in Colombia.

References

Moths described in 1919
spathista